Nobody's Perfect is a British comedy television series which originally aired on ITV from 1980 to 1982. It was an adaptation of the American series Maude.

Main cast
 Elaine Stritch as Bill Hooper
 Richard Griffiths as Sam Hooper
 Moray Watson as Henry Armstrong
 Ruby Head as  Mrs. Whicker
 Kim Braden as Liz Parker
 Simon Nash as Sammy

References

Bibliography
 Miller, Jeffrey S. Something Completely Different: British Television and American Culture : 1960-1980, Volume 2. Michigan State University, 1997.

External links
 

1980 British television series debuts
1982 British television series endings
1980s British comedy television series
ITV sitcoms
English-language television shows
London Weekend Television shows